The 2019 Rally Mexico (also known as the Rally Guanajuato Mexico 2019) was a motor racing event for rally cars that was held over four days between 7 and 10 March 2019. It marked the sixteenth running of Rally Mexico and was the third round of the 2019 World Rally Championship, World Rally Championship-2 and the newly-created WRC-2 Pro class. The 2019 event was based in the town of León in Guanajuato and consisted of twenty-one special stages.

Reigning World Drivers' and World Co-Drivers Champions Sébastien Ogier and Julien Ingrassia were the defending rally winners. M-Sport Ford WRT, the team they drove for in 2018, were the defending manufacturers' winners. Pontus Tidemand and Jonas Andersson were the defending rally winners of WRC-2, but they did not participate in the event.

Ogier and Ingrassia successfully defended their titles. Their team, Citroën World Rally Team, were the manufacturers' winners. The M-Sport Ford WRT crew of Łukasz Pieniążek and Kamil Heller won the WRC-2 Pro category, while Benito Guerra and Jaime Zapata won the wider WRC-2 class, finishing first in the combined WRC-2 category.

Background

Championship standings prior to the event

Ott Tänak and Martin Järveoja led both the drivers' and co-drivers' championships for the first time in their career, with a seven-point ahead of Thierry Neuville and Nicolas Gilsoul. Six-time world champions Sébastien Ogier and Julien Ingrassia were third, a further nine points behind. In the World Rally Championship for Manufacturers, defending manufacturers' champions Toyota Gazoo Racing WRT held a one-point lead over Hyundai Shell Mobis WRT.

In the World Rally Championship-2 Pro standings, Gus Greensmith and Elliott Edmondson held a four-point lead ahead of Kalle Rovanperä and Jonne Halttunen in the drivers' and co-drivers' standings respectively. Mads Østberg and Torstein Eriksen were third, eleven points further back. In the manufacturers' championship, M-Sport Ford WRT led Škoda Motorsport by sixteen points, with eleven-point-behind Citroën Total in third.

In the World Rally Championship-2 standings, Ole Christian Veiby and Jonas Andersson led the drivers' and co-drivers' standings by fifteen points respectively. Yoann Bonato and Benjamin Boulloud were second, with Adrien Fourmaux and Renaud Jamoul in third in each standings, another eight points behind.

Entry list
The following crews entered into the rally. The event was open to crews competing in the World Rally Championship, World Rally Championship-2, WRC-2 Pro and privateer entries not registered to score points in any championship. A total of twenty-three entries were received, with ten crews entered with World Rally Cars and five entered the World Rally Championship-2. Only one crew was nominated to score points in the Pro class.

Route
All the stages are located in the state of Guanajuato. Compared with the 2018 edition, the route of the 2019 edition was  shorter. The Duarte — Derramadero stage was removed. Instead, the Mesa Cuata stage joined the itinerary.

Itinerary

All dates and times are CST (UTC-6).

Report

World Rally Cars
The 2019 edition of Rally Mexico started with a curtailment of the opening stage due to an irreparable damaged jump. Andreas Mikkelsen took a short-lived lead on Friday morning, but the Norwegian lost his lead to Sébastien Ogier as they hit a rock and damaged the suspension. Teammate Dani Sordo also forced to retire from the day due to electrical issue. Jari-Matti Latvala was running in fourth before retiring with alternator failure. The other major retirement of the first leg was Teemu Suninen, who went off the road in his Fiesta. The young Finn retired from the rally in the end.

It turned out that Ogier was a lucky man. Despite a front-left puncture, he still reduced his time loss to just twenty seconds as his teammate Esapekka Lappi went off the road and caused the red flag, which saved his rally-winning chances. However, Kris Meeke wasn't as fortunate, as he suffered a puncture on the following Otates stage, with damaged suspension, which dropped him from the lead down to fifth place. Eventually, Ogier net his fifth Mexico victory with a power stage victory, surpassed Thierry Neuville in the drivers' standings in second, narrowing to four points off the championship leader Ott Tänak, who finished second overall, with Elfyn Evans got his first podium finish of the season.

The rally was not without controversy however. The damaged ramp was met with criticism, deeming it to be unnecessarily dangerous to both drivers and spectators, and allegations of cheating surfaced with Kris Meeke accusing Citroen of abusing red flag rules to give Ogier an unfair advantage; Meeke would later retract his statement in an apology.

Classification

Special stages

Championship standings

World Rally Championship-2 Pro
The only WRC-2 Pro driver Łukasz Pieniążek was unable to complete Friday as he crashed out in SS6. After re-entering the rally, he enjoyed a trouble-free day and eventually won the category.

Classification

Special stages
Results in bold denote first in the RC2 class, the class which both the WRC-2 Pro and WRC-2 championships run to.

Championship standings

World Rally Championship-2
Eighteen-year-old driver Marco Bulacia Wilkinson edged Benito Guerra in 9.8 seconds. The two dominated the category in two Fabia R5s as they won all eight stages of Friday combined. On the leg 2, Guerra surpassed Wilkinson and ended the day with a lead over three and a half minutes. Heller brothers both failed to finished the day. Alberto Heller retired with broken steering, while Pedro Heller retired with a mechanical issue. They restarted in the final leg, but Pedro Heller retired from the rally because of a mechanical issue. The event went into Guerra's pocket in the end, which is his first home victory in his career.

Classification

Special stages
Results in bold denote first in the RC2 class, the class which both the WRC-2 Pro and WRC-2 championships run to.

Championship standings

Notes

References

External links

  
 2019 Rally Mexico in e-wrc website
 The official website of the World Rally Championship

2019 in Mexican motorsport
Mexico
March 2019 sports events in Mexico
2019 Rally Mexico